Julia Deuerlein (born 1 May 1990) is a German professional racing cyclist. She rides for the No Radunion Vitalogic team.

See also
 List of 2015 UCI Women's Teams and riders

References

External links
 
 

1990 births
Living people
German female cyclists
People from Rosenheim
Sportspeople from Upper Bavaria
Cyclists from Bavaria